The Eastwood City Walk of Fame or the Walk of Fame Philippines is a walk of fame patterned after the Hollywood Walk of Fame, and is located in Eastwood City, Quezon City. It was founded on December 1, 2005. As German Moreno's home network,  GMA Network is the official media partner of Walk of Fame  since 2005 that were supported by GMA Network's bosses Atty. Felipe L. Gozon and Mr. Duavit Jimenez Jr.

History
The Walk of Fame Philippines project almost failed to launch due to lack of budget and connection; fortunately the Head of MOWELFUND Miss Boots Anson-Roa during that time, recommended to German Moreno to support the project by using his connection to the artists of the Philippines show business, being tagged as the Mr. Showman himself and was launched in 2005. The unveiling of stars happen every December. Stars were awarded twice a year from 2006 until 2008 and from 2013 to 2014. The Walk of Fame is a project of the German Moreno Walk of Fame Foundation (formerly the Walk of Fame Gallery and Museum), a non-profit organization founded by the late German Moreno, which the expense is from his own pocket. Entrepreneur Alice Eduardo joined him as co-owner in 2013.

Following Moreno's death on January 8, 2016, Megaworld Corporation Senior Associate Vice President and Head for Marketing Tefel Pesigan-Valentino and Quezon City Mayor Herbert Bautista announced that they will continue the Walk of Fame as part of the "City of Stars" project, which was approved by the city's local government in 2014. In February 2016, it was announced that Moreno's son, Federico will become Walk of Fame's president and general manager.

Criteria
From its inception in 2005 until 2015, there are no clear criteria for the stars to be immortalized in the Philippine version of walk of fame. Names are handpicked by German Moreno. Moreno, at times, has claimed inductees are picked not by request of the inductee but by the person's popularity and contribution to the Philippine entertainment industry and in some cases based on a person's contribution to the Philippines. This was changed in 2016 when his son Federico Moreno took over as president and general manager, where the list of inductees, similar to the Hollywood Walk of Fame, are being selected by the German Moreno Walk of Fame Foundation's Selection Committee into six categories: Movies, Television, News and Public Affairs, Radio, Music and Theater. A seventh category, Social Media, was added in 2020.

Criticism
The Walk of Fame Philippines in Eastwood has been criticised for honoring actors based primarily on fame, for inducting actors who are yet to contribute greatly in the entertainment industry and for including foreigners earlier than the locals.

Inductees
, 370 names have been inducted into the Walk of Fame. These inductees include actors, hosts, writers, directors and producers of movies, television and theater; singers, songwriters and musicians; news anchors and reporters; radio personalities; athletes; social media personalities and notable achievers.

December 2005

 Sharon Cuneta
 Fernando Poe Jr.†
 Susan Roces†
 Joseph Estrada
 Vilma Santos
 Nora Aunor
 Gloria Romero
 Dolphy†
 Eddie Garcia†
 Ramon Revilla Sr.†
 Rosa del Rosario†

 Atang de la Rama†
 Rogelio dela Rosa†
 Carmen Rosales†
 Fernando Poe Sr.†
 Nida Blanca†
 Leopoldo Salcedo†
 Amalia Fuentes†
 Tita Duran†
 Pancho Magalona†
 Nestor de Villa†
 Katy de la Cruz†

January 2006

 Christopher de Leon
 Lilia Dizon†
 Hilda Koronel
 Pilita Corrales
 Delia Razon
 Anita Linda†
 Jose Mari Gonzales†
 Tony Santos, Sr.†
 Mario Montenegro†
 Boots Anson-Roa

 Lolita Rodriguez
 Oscar Moreno†
 Barbara Perez
 José Padilla†
 Rosa Rosal
 Fred Montilla†
 Armando Goyena†
 Charito Solis†
 Eddie Rodriguez†
 Efren Reyes, Sr.†

December 2006

 Tessie Agana
 Boy Alano†
 Bong Revilla
 Lito Lapid
 Eddie Gutierrez
 Lea Salonga
 Manny Pacquiao
 Judy Ann Santos
 Jinggoy Estrada
 Ruffa Gutierrez
 Richard Gomez
 Cesar Montano
 Zsa Zsa Padilla
 Robin Padilla
 Paraluman†
 Cesar Ramirez†
 Manuel Conde†

 Phillip Salvador
 Jaime dela Rosa†
 Chiquito†
 Aga Muhlach
 Mona Lisa†
 Rudy Fernandez†
 Gloria Diaz
 Maricel Soriano
 Lorna Tolentino
 Alicia Vergel†
 Marlene Dauden
 Zaldy Zshornack†
 Tessie Quintana†
 Edna Luna†
 Vic Vargas†
 Romeo Vasquez†

January 2007

 Billy Crawford

December 2007

 Charo Santos-Concio
 Gina Pareño
 Kris Aquino
 Kuh Ledesma
 Regine Velasquez
 Piolo Pascual
 Richard Gutierrez

 Snooky Serna
 Gary Valenciano
 Martin Nievera
 Vina Morales
 Mila del Sol
 Celia Rodriguez
 Juancho Gutierrez

June 2008
 Eddie Mesa
 Rosemarie Gil
 Oscar Obligacion
 Linda Estrella
 Sylvia La Torre
 Rudy Concepcion
 Rosario Moreno

December 2008

 Gina Alajar
 Helen Gamboa
 Albert Martinez
 Dawn Zulueta
 Herbert Bautista
 Dina Bonnevie

 Tirso Cruz III
 Dulce
 Claudine Barretto
 Marian Rivera
 Dingdong Dantes
 Dindo Fernando

December 2009

 John Lloyd Cruz
 Sarah Geronimo
 Armida Siguion-Reyna
 Ogie Alcasid
 Janno Gibbs
 Jolina Magdangal
 Francis Magalona
 Michael V.
 Aiza Seguerra
 Gabby Concepcion
 Christian Bautista
 Jed Madela
 KC Concepcion
 Cherry Pie Picache
 Yul Servo

 Isko Moreno
 Jaclyn Jose
 Nonito Donaire
 APO Hiking Society
 Rey Valera
 Basil Valdez
 Rico J. Puno
 Hajji Alejandro
 Marky Cielo
 Jackie Lou Blanco
 Ricky Davao
 Luis Gonzales
 Dingdong Avanzado
 Niño Muhlach
 Jose Mari Chan

December 2010

 Tito Sotto
 Vic Sotto
 Joey de Leon
 Sheryl Cruz
 Manilyn Reynes
 Coco Martin
 Paeng Nepomuceno
 Jericho Rosales
 Kim Chiu
 Gerald Anderson
 Mel Tiangco
 Mike Enriquez
 Noli de Castro
 Korina Sanchez
 Imelda Papin
 Claire dela Fuente

 Eva Eugenio
 Norma Blancaflor
 Johnny Delgado
 Julie Vega†
 Janice de Belen
 Bella Flores
 Diether Ocampo
 Charice Pempengco
 Freddie Aguilar
 Che Che Lazaro
 Boy Abunda
 Divina Valencia
 Perla Bautista
 Lani Mercado
 Ronnie Ricketts
 Jacky Woo

December 2011

 Luz Valdez
 Marita Zobel
 Liberty Ilagan
 Robert Arevalo
 Rustica Carpio
 Caridad Sanchez
 Elizabeth Ramsey
 Coney Reyes
 Gloria Sevilla
 Pilar Pilapil
 Ai Ai delas Alas
 Eugene Domingo
 Angel Locsin
 Anne Curtis
 Carmina Villarroel
 Iza Calzado
 Carla Abellana

 Lovi Poe
 Rhian Ramos
 Marvin Agustin
 Sam Milby
 Heart Evangelista
 Joey Albert
 Celeste Legaspi
 Cocoy Laurel
 Jessica Soho
 Tina Monzon-Palma
 Paquito Diaz
 Inday Badiday
 Helen Vela
 AJ Perez†
 Ike Lozada†
 Miko Sotto

December 2012

 Marilou Diaz-Abaya
 Rosa Mia
 Leroy Salvador
 Angelo Castro, Jr.
 Carlo J. Caparas
 Ricky Reyes (hairdresser)
 Al Quinn
 Lucy Torres-Gomez
 Anthony Castelo
 Lani Misalucha
 Ricky Lo
 Arnold Clavio
 Bea Alonzo
 Amy Austria

 Rio Locsin
 Nova Villa
 Ronaldo Valdez
 Jean Garcia
 Alma Moreno
 Alfred Vargas
 Jessica Sanchez
 Ara Mina
 Jessa Zaragoza
 Roderick Paulate
 ER Ejercito
 Gretchen Barretto
 Pops Fernandez
 Dennis Trillo

April 2013

 David Pomeranz

December 2013

 German Moreno†
 Alice Eduardo
 Armi Kuusela
 Aurora Pijuan
 Bembol Roco
 Edgar Mortiz
 Gemma Cruz
 Gladys Reyes
 Jamie Rivera
 Joel Torre
 Joel Cruz
 Precious Lara Quigaman
 Laurice Guillen
 Toni Gonzaga

 Megan Young
 Wing Duo
 Manding Claro
 Dr. Manny Calayan
 Dr. Pie Calayan
 Margie Moran
 Melanie Marquez
 Rob Schneider
 Anderson Cooper
 Stella Marquez
 TJ Trinidad
 Vicky Morales
 Paul Walker
 Justin Bieber

April 2014

 Rose Fostanes
 Robert Lopez
 Michael Christian Martinez
 Nanding Josef

December 2014

 Vice Ganda
 Kathryn Bernardo
 Daniel Padilla
 Daisy Romualdez
 Lisa Macuja-Elizalde
 Angelito Nepomuceno
 Jestoni Alarcon
 Tony Ferrer
 Sylvia Sanchez
 Evangeline Pascual
 Tom Rodriguez
 Lito Legaspi

 Carmi Martin
 Jaya
 Aiko Melendez
 Allan K
 Angel Aquino
 Luis Gabriel Moreno
 Willie Revillame
 Cory Quirino
 Chanda Romero
 Dante Rivero
 Joel Lamangan

December 2015
Coinciding with the 10th anniversary of Walk of Fame Philippines.

Alden Richards
Maine Mendoza
Jose Manalo
Wally Bayola
Paolo Ballesteros
Alice Dixson
Rocco Nacino
Eula Valdez
Julie Anne San Jose
Sunshine Dizon
Camille Prats

Jake Vargas
Randy Santiago
Mark Bautista
Enrique Gil
Sam Concepcion
Dindi Gallardo
Herminio “Butch” Bautista
Kara David
Gerphil Flores
Buboy Villar
Jason Abalos
The Company

December 2016

John Arcilla
Michelle Madrigal
Jennylyn Mercado
Angelica Panganiban
Jodi Sta. Maria
Shaina Magdayao
Barbie Forteza
Ted Failon
Luchi Cruz-Valdes

Ella Cruz
Liza Soberano
Susan Enriquez
Eddie Ilarde
Manolo Favis
Pepe Smith
Willy Cruz†
Zenaida Amador†
William Erwin Benipayo
Arlene Muhlach
Jong Narciso
Parabanne Mendoza

November 2017

Atom Araullo
Solenn Heussaff
Kris Bernal
Parokya ni Edgar
Jake Zyrus
Empoy Marquez
Lily Monteverde
Matteo Guidicelli
Mely Tagasa
Joe D' Mango

Freddie Santos
Karen Davila
Anthony Taberna
Tulfo Brothers (Mon, Ben, Erwin, Raffy)
Isabel Granada
Joe Taruc
Chichay
Emmanuel Borlaza
Eddie Romero

December 2018

Marichu Vera Perez-Maceda
Dr. Jose Perez
Julia Barretto
Chito Roño
Derek Ramsay
James Reid
Pia Wurtzbach
Vhong Navarro
Ken Chan
Rico Hizon
Bernadette Sembrano

January 2020

Kim Atienza
Catriona Gray
Jo Koy
Rachelle Ann Go
Nanette Inventor
Jiggy Manicad
Jun Banaag
Edu Manzano
Alex Gonzaga
Rovic Diaz Jr.

January 2023

 Hidilyn Diaz
 Maja Salvador
 Mario Dumaual
 Ricky Lee
 Janet Basco
 Gerry Baja
 Ranz Kyle Guerrero
 Niana Guerrero
 Tony Mabesa†

Gallery

See also 
 Hollywood Walk of Fame, Los Angeles
 Canada's Walk of Fame, Toronto
 Avenue of Stars, Hong Kong
 Paseo de las Luminarias, Mexico City
 List of halls and walks of fame

References

Public art in Metro Manila
Walks of fame
Tourist attractions in Quezon City
Awards established in 2005
2005 establishments in the Philippines